To Grandmother's House We Go is a 1992 made-for-television Christmas film directed by Jeff Franklin and starring Mary-Kate and Ashley Olsen. The film's title comes from a part of one of the first lines of Lydia Maria Child's Thanksgiving song "Over the River and Through the Wood". It debuted on ABC as a star vehicle for the Olsens, who were starring in Franklin's Full House at the time, and marked their first appearance as separate characters.

Plot
5-year-old twins Sarah and Julie (Mary-Kate Olsen and Ashley Olsen) are sweet but naughty, to the frustration of their single mother, Rhonda (Cynthia Geary). After overhearing her say she needs a break from them, they decide to run away to great-grandmother's house in Edgemont for Christmas.

The girls sneak onto a city bus, but learn that it only goes downtown, and that Edgemont is three hours away. After getting off the bus downtown, Sarah and Julie spot Eddie (J. Eddie Peck), a delivery man who has a crush on their mom and a love for cowboys. They sneak into the back of his truck for a ride, but are quickly discovered. Although Eddie generally dislikes children, he warms up to the charming girls over time, eventually buying a lottery ticket with the girls' birthdate for the numbers.

Meanwhile, their babysitter has noticed the girls are missing and informs Rhonda, who rushes home and calls the police. Eddie calls and explains that he has the girls, promising to bring them back at the end of the day. Eddie drives the girls home, but the truck is stolen with the girls inside before they can be reunited with their mother. 

When the thieves, Harvey and Shirley (Jerry Van Dyke and Rhea Perlman), discover the girls, they decide they can make some money by holding them for ransom. They convince the girls they are taking them to their grandmother's house, so they will cooperate. Shirley calls Rhonda and asks for $10,000 in cash. She says they will make the trade at the ice rink in Edgemont, and that Rhonda is to wear a red hat. Meanwhile, Harvey has begun to like the girls. 

Eddie and Rhonda reluctantly raise the ransom money by pawning the contents of packages which Eddie is supposed to be delivering. Staff at the pawnshops become suspicious and alert police. Believing they are known criminals Harvey and Shirley, Detective Gremp (Stuart Margolin) writes out a warrant for their arrest.

Everyone makes it to the skating rink in Edgemont, although tensions are rising between both couples. When Harvey reveals that they are not going to their grandmother's house, the twins run off. They encounter the park's Santa Claus, who has a horse and carriage made up to look like reindeer and Santa's sleigh. The twins race off in the carriage, still trying to reach their grandmother's house. The horses gallop towards a steep ravine, and Eddie is forced to use his cowboy skills to rescue the girls. Unbeknownst to Eddie and the girls, they have actually stopped right outside the home of the girls' great-grandmother, Mimi (Florence Paterson).

Just as everything settles down, Detective Gremp and one of his officials arrives to arrest Eddie and Rhonda, still believing they are the thieves. Although Shirley tries to take the opportunity to flee, Harvey feels bad and confesses everything, and they are arrested. 

Gremp agrees to bring Eddie, Rhonda and the girls back to the city with him, so Eddie can be back in time to be able to have a chance at winning the lottery with the ticket he bought. He promises to split what he wins between Rhonda and the girls, and has the girls spin the prize wheel for him. He ends up winning the jackpot. Afterward, they give all the people their parcels back, and everybody is happy spending Christmas together.

Cast
 Ashley Olsen as Julie Thompson
 Mary-Kate Olsen as Sarah Thompson
 Cynthia Geary as Rhonda Thompson, Sarah and Julie's divorced mother
 J. Eddie Peck as Eddie Popko, a package delivery man who has a crush on Rhonda
 Jerry Van Dyke as Harvey, one of the FPD Bandits
 Rhea Perlman as Shirley, one of the FPD Bandits
 Stuart Margolin as Det. Gremp 
 Florence Paterson as Great Grandma Mimi 
 Venus Terzo as Stacey, the babysitter
 Andrew Wheeler as Policeman 
 Rick Poltaruk as Santa 
 Walter Marsh as Crotchety Man 
 Bob Saget as Win-O-Lotto Lottery Host
 Lori Loughlin as Win-O-Lotto Lottery Hostess 
 Lorena Gale as Waitress

Andrea Barber and Candace Cameron cameo as audience members.

Release
To Grandmother's House We Go was filmed in Vancouver, British Columbia, Canada. The carnival scenes were filmed in Edgemont Village, a neighborhood in North Vancouver, British Columbia, Canada. It debuted in the United States on December 6, 1992.

See also
 List of Christmas films

References

External links

1992 television films
1992 films
American Christmas films
American television films
Christmas television films
Films about child abduction in the United States
Films about twin sisters
Films shot in Vancouver
1990s Christmas films
Twins in fiction